The Australia men's national rugby sevens team participates in international competitions such as the World Rugby Sevens Series and Rugby World Cup Sevens. The current captain of the team is Nick Malouf, and the head coach is John Manenti .

Rugby sevens is now recognised as an Olympic sport and made its debut at the 2016 Summer Olympics. Australia qualified for the tournament after winning the 2015 Oceania Sevens Championship.

Australia also competes at other international tournaments for rugby sevens, including at the Commonwealth Games.

Team name 
The Australia men's national sevens side, as confirmed by head coach Andy Friend in an interview with Green and Gold Rugby website, does not have a nickname as of 2016. The team is sometimes erroneously referred to as the Aussie Thunderbolts in sections of the media, but that name refers to Australia's developmental sevens side (the second team) rather than the official national team.

At the inaugural Hong Kong Sevens tournament in 1976, Australia was represented by a selected team under the name Wallaroos, originally the name of one of the foundation clubs of the Southern Rugby Union in 1874, but now used for the Australian women's team in 15-a-side rugby. Australia has also been represented at international sevens tournaments by the Australian Barbarians club.

Honours
Australia has won the following:

World Rugby Sevens Series
 Champion: 2021–22
 Runner-up: 2000–01
 Third place: 1999–2000, 2004–05

World Cup Sevens
 Silver medal: 2009, 2022
 Bronze medal: 2005

Commonwealth Games Sevens
 Silver medal: 2010
 Bronze medal: 1998, 2014

Rugby sevens at the World Games 
 Silver medal: 2001

Major tournament wins
 Hong Kong Sevens: 1979, 1982, 1983, 1985, 1988, 2022
 Australian Sevens: 1987, 2002, 2018
 London Sevens: 2010, 2022
 Paris Sevens: 1998
 Wellington Sevens: 2001
 Kuala Lumpur Sevens: 2001
 Shanghai Sevens: 2001
 Tokyo Sevens: 2012

Regional and other tournament wins
 Oceania Sevens: 2010, 2012, 2015, 2019
 Oktoberfest Sevens: 2017

Tournament record
A red box around the year indicates a tournament played in Australia. An asterisk (*) indicates a shared placing.

Rugby World Cup Sevens

World Games

Olympic Games

Commonwealth Games

Oceania Sevens

Notes:
 Rugby Sevens was discontinued at the World Games after 2013 due to the sport returning to the Olympics in 2016.

 Australia VII or development team entered

World Rugby Sevens Series

2000s

2010s

2020s

Players

Player records
The following shows leading career Australia players based on statistics from the World Rugby Sevens Series. Players in bold are still active.

Previous squads
 2017–18 World Rugby Sevens Series

2013–14 Sevens World Series

James Stannard
Greg Jeloudev
Con Foley
Sam Myers
Ed Jenkins
Sean McMahon
Jesse Parahi
Paul Asquith
Nick Malouf
Tom Lucas
Luke Morahan
Shannon Walker

2010–11 Sevens World Series

Hamish Angus
Trent Dyer
Bernard Foley
Shaun Foley
John Grant
Michael Hodge
Nicholas Phipps
Greg Jeloudev
Ed Jenkins
Tevita Kuridrani
Jono Lance
Daniel Yakopo

2010 Commonwealth Games

Bernard Foley
Brian Sefanaia
James Stannard
Kimami Sitauti
Lachie Turner
Liam Gill
Luke Morahan
Luke Phipps
Nick Cummins
Pat McCabe
Pat McCutcheon
Robbie Coleman

Captains
 Ed Jenkins 2011–2016
 Sam Myers 2016 
 TBC – 2017
 Lewis Holland, James Stannard, Con Foley, Jesse Parahi – 2018
 Lewis Holland – 2019

Coaches

See also

 National Rugby Sevens Championships
 Australia national rugby union team

References

External links
 Official website 
 WorldRugby profile

Australia national rugby union team
National rugby sevens teams
Rugby sevens in Australia
1973 establishments in Australia